Alberto Santana (1897–1966) was a Chilean screenwriter and film producer. He directed twenty five films during a career that took him to several countries. Santana was important in developing Ecuadorian cinema, producing They Met in Guayaquil (1949) and directing Dawn in Pichincha (1950) the first and second Ecuadorian sound films.

Selected filmography

Director
 Dawn in Pichincha (1950)

References

Bibliography 
 Handelsman, Michael. Culture and Customs of Ecuador. Greenwood Publishing Group, 2000.

External links 
 

1897 births
1966 deaths
Chilean film directors
Chilean screenwriters
Male screenwriters
People from Iquique
20th-century screenwriters